The FIBA Asia Under-20 Championship refers to the under-20 championship for basketball in the International Basketball Federation's FIBA Asia zone. The event started in 1992. It was formerly the Asian Basketball Confederation 22 & Under Championship, before the age limit was lowered to the current 20 in 2002. It was also formerly known as the Asian Basketball Confederation Championship for Young Men. The winners compete in the FIBA Under-21 World Championship. FIBA no longer hold world championships for this age group.

Summary

Medal table

Participating nations

References

 
Basketball competitions in Asia between national teams
Asia
Asia Under-20 Championship